The 2019 Sudanese coup d'état took place on the late afternoon of 11 April 2019, when Sudanese President Omar al-Bashir was overthrown by the Sudanese army after popular protests demanded his departure. At that time, the army, led by Ahmed Awad Ibn Auf, toppled the government and National Legislature and declared a state of emergency in the country for a period of 3 months, followed by a transitional period of two years before an agreement was reached later.

Background

Protests have been ongoing in Sudan since 19 December 2018 when a series of demonstrations broke out in several cities due to dramatically rising costs of living and the deterioration of the country's economy. In January 2019, the protests shifted attention from economic matters to calls of resignation for the long time President of Sudan Omar al-Bashir.

By February 2019, Bashir had declared the first state of national emergency in twenty years amidst increasing unrest.

Coup d'état and aftermath
On 11 April, the Sudanese military removed Omar al-Bashir from his position as President of Sudan, dissolved the cabinet and the National Legislature, and announced a three-month state of emergency, to be followed by a two-year transition period. Lt. Gen. Ahmed Awad Ibn Auf, who was both the defense minister of Sudan and the Vice President of Sudan, declared himself the de facto Head of State, announced the suspension of the country's constitution, and imposed a curfew from 10 pm to 4 am, effectively ordering the dissolution of the ongoing protests. Along with the National Legislature and national government, state governments and legislative councils in Sudan were dissolved as well.

State media reported that all political prisoners, including anti-Bashir protest leaders, were being released from jail. Al-Bashir's National Congress Party responded by announcing that they would hold a rally supporting the ousted president. Soldiers also raided the offices of the Islamic Movement, the main ideological wing of the National Congress, in Khartoum.

On 12 April, the ruling military government agreed to shorten the length of its rule to "as early as a month" and transfer control to a civilian government if negotiations could result in a new government being formed. That evening, Auf stepped down as head of the military council and made Lt. Gen. Abdel Fattah Abdelrahman Burhan, who serves as general inspector of the armed forces, his successor. This came following protests over his decision not to extradite Bashir to the International Criminal Court. The resignation was regarded as a "triumph" by the protestors, who were overjoyed. Burhan is considered to have a cleaner record than the rest of al-Bashir's generals and is not wanted or implicated for war crimes by any international court. He was one of the generals who had reached out to protesters during their week-long encampment near the military headquarters, meeting with them face to face and listening to their views.

Despite the imposed curfew, protesters remained on the streets. On 13 April, Burhan announced in his first televised address that the curfew which had been imposed by Auf was now lifted and that an order was issued to complete the release of all prisoners jailed under emergency laws ordered by Bashir. Hours beforehand, members of the ruling military council released a statement to Sudanese television which stated that Burhan had accepted the resignation of intelligence and security chief Salah Gosh. Gosh had overseen the crackdown of protestors who opposed al-Bashir. Following these announcements, talks between the protestors and the military to transition to a civilian government officially started.

In a statement, several Sudanese activists, including those of the Sudanese Professionals Association and the Sudanese Communist Party, denounced the Transitional Military Council as a government of "the same faces and entities that our great people have revolted against". The activists demanded that power be handed over to a civilian government. On 12 April, Col. General Omar Zein al-Abideen, a member of the Transitional Military Council, announced that the transfer of Sudanese government to civilian rule would take place in "as early as a month if a government is formed" and offered to start talks with protestors to start this transition. On 14 April 2019, it was announced that council had agreed to have the protestors nominate a civilian Prime Minister and have civilians run every Government ministry outside the Defense and Interior Ministries. The same day, military council spokesman Shams El Din Kabbashi Shinto announced that Auf had been removed as Defense Minister and Lt. General Abu Bakr Mustafa was named to succeed Gosh as chief of Sudan's National Intelligence and Security Service (NISS).

On 15 April 2019, Shams al-Din Kabbashi announced that "The former ruling National Congress Party (NCP) will not participate in any transitional government". Despite being barred from the transitional government, the NCP has not been barred from taking part in future elections. Prominent activist Mohammed Naji al-Asam announced that trust was also growing between the military and the protestors following more talks and the release of more political prisoners, despite a poorly organized attempt by the army to disperse the sit-in. It was also announced that the military council was restructuring, which began with the appointments of Colonel General Hashem Abdel Muttalib Ahmed Babakr as army chief of staff and Colonel General Mohamed Othman al-Hussein as deputy chief of staff.

On 15 April, the African Union gave Sudan 15 days to install a civilian government. If the ruling military council does not comply, Sudan will be suspended as a member of the AU. On 16 April, the military council announced that Burhan had again cooperated with the demands of the protestors and sacked the nation's three top prosecutors, including chief prosecutor Omar Ahmed Mohamed Abdelsalam, public prosecutor Amer Ibrahim Majid, and deputy public prosecutor Hesham Othman Ibrahim Saleh. The same day, two sources with direct knowledge told CNN that Bashir, his former interior minister Abdelrahim Mohamed Hussein, and Ahmed Haroun, the former head of the ruling party, will be charged with corruption and the death of protesters. On 23 April, the AU agreed to extend the transition deadline from 15 days to three months.

On 24 April, three members of the Transitional Military Council submitted their resignations. Those who resigned included political committee chair Lieutenant-General Omar Zain al-Abideen, Lieutenant-General Jalal al-Deen al-Sheikh and Lieutenant-General Al-Tayeb Babakr Ali Fadeel. On 27 April, an agreement was reached to form a transitional council made up jointly of civilians and military, though the exact details of the power-sharing arrangement were not yet agreed upon, as both sides wanted to have a majority. The military also announced the resignation of the three military council generals.

Dozens of women were raped on 3 June 2019 by Sudanese security forces and at least 87 people were killed by Rapid Support Forces (RSF) and other troops tore apart a sit-in camp Khartoum.

Fate of al-Bashir and his allies
After being detained, al-Bashir was initially placed under house arrest under heavy guard; his personal bodyguard was dismissed. Lt. General Omar Zain al-Abideen, who at the time also served as head of the Transitional Military Council's political committee, said that the military government would not extradite al-Bashir to The Hague to face charges in the International Criminal Court (ICC), where al-Bashir is the subject of an arrest warrant on counts of crimes against humanity and war crimes in connection with the Darfur genocide between 2003 and 2008. Al-Abideen said, however, that the military government would seek to prosecute al-Bashir in Sudan.

More than 100 of al-Bashir's allies, including Prime Minister Mohamed Taher Ayala, National Congress Party leader and ICC fugitive for war crimes and crimes against humanity Ahmed Haroun, member of the National Congress Awad Al-Jaz, and former vice presidents Bakri Hassan Saleh and Ali Othman Taha were also arrested. Former defense minister and Khartoum state Governor Abdel Rahim Mohammed Hussein, also subject to an ICC arrest warrant for war crimes and crimes against humanity, was also arrested. More people who had served in al-Bashir's government were reported to have been arrested on 14 April 2019, as well. Among the people arrested on 14 April included the head of the party's political sector Abdel Rahman al-Khidir, former Interior Minister Ibrahim Mahmoud, former Presidential Affairs Minister Fadl Abdallah, and head of the party's youth sector Mohamed al-Amin.

On 17 April 2019, two prison officials, as well as members of al-Bashir's family, confirmed that al-Bashir was transferred from the presidential palace, where he had been under house arrest, to Khartoum's Kobar Maximum Security Prison. Al-Bashir was reported to be surrounded by tight security and held in solitary confinement, in the same prison where he had held political prisoners during his time in power. This came a day after Uganda's Minister for Foreign Affairs Henry Oryem Okello considered offering the former Sudan President asylum in Uganda. Several other allies of al-Bashir are being held at the prison as well. The reports of al-Bashir's transfer were later confirmed to Al Jazeera by a prison guard. Military council spokesman Shams Eldin Kabashi added that two of al-Bashir's brothers, Abdullah al-Bashir and Alabas al-Bashir, were arrested as well.

On 20 April, officials located suitcases "loaded with cash" in al-Bashir's home and added that the secretary general of the Islamic movement Al-Zubair Ahmed Hassan and former parliament speaker Ahmed Ibrahim al-Taher were among those arrested as well. It was later revealed that the suitcases contained a total of around $6.7 million. Parliament speaker Ibrahim Ahmed Omar and presidential aide Nafie Ali Nafie were also placed under house arrest.

On 7 May 2019, 21 former officials who served in al-Bashir's National Democratic Alliance (NDA) in South Darfur were arrested after attempting to flee the country. On 8 May, it was revealed that some of the South Darfur officials who arrested were women. On 20 May 2019, suspects who confessed to killing five pro-democracy protestors were arrested.

Agreement reached on transition government and Constitution
A deal was agreed verbally between the TMC and the civilian protesters represented by the Forces of Freedom and Change (FFC) on 5 July and a written form of the agreement was signed by the TMC and FFC on 17 July 2019. The TMC and FFC announced that they would share power to run Sudan via executive and legislative institutions and a judicial investigation of post-coup events, including the Khartoum massacre, until elections occur in mid-2022. On 17 July 2019, The deal plans for leadership of the sovereign council to be transferred from a military leader to a civilian leader 21 months after the transitional period begins, for a total of 39 months, leading to elections in 2022. On 3 August 2019, terms concerning a transitional government and new Constitution were finalized. On 4 August 2019, Opposition leader Ahmed Rabie and Gen Mohamed Hamdan Daglo signed the Constitutional Declaration, which also ensured that six civilians and five military officials will lead the Sudanese government during the three-year transition period.

International reactions

Supranational organizations 
 : The United Nations released a statement urging the new government not to use violence against peaceful protestors.
 : The African Union condemned the coup, saying the move is not the appropriate response to the challenges facing Sudan and the aspirations of its people.
 : The EU stated that it is monitoring the situation in Sudan and calls on all parties to refrain from violence and find a way to ensure a peaceful transition.

Other countries 
 : Egypt's government expressed support for the Sudanese people.
 : France's government is watching the developing situation closely, calling for the voice of the Sudanese people to be heard and supporting the peace process.
 : Germany's government called for a peaceful solution in order to defuse the crisis.
 : Many Russian lawmakers have condemned the organizers of the coup.
 : Saudi Arabia welcomed the new developments and promised economic aid.
 : Turkish President Recep Tayyip Erdogan stated he hopes that a "normal democratic process" returns to Sudan.
: UAE welcomed the new developments. 
 : The United States released a statement supporting a peaceful transition to a civilian-led government within two years, emphasizing the necessity of taking action to establish democracy.

References

External links
News articles at BBC News

Sudan
Coup d'état
Sudan
Sudan
Government of Sudan
Sudan
Military coups in Sudan
Politics of Sudan
Sudan
Coup d'état
Sudan